Wortendyke Barn, at 13 Pascack Road in Park Ridge, Bergen County, New Jersey, United States, was built in 1770 and added to the National Register of Historic Places on August 2, 1972. The historic Dutch barn
was restored by Bergen County in 1973. The barn is home to the Wortendyke Barn Museum. The museum contains an exhibit on the development of agriculture in Bergen County.

See also 

 National Register of Historic Places listings in Bergen County, New Jersey
 List of museums in New Jersey
 Updike Parsonage Barn
 List of the oldest buildings in New Jersey

References

External links
  Wortendyke Barn Museum - Bergen County Parks 
 Wortendyke New World Dutch Barn - history and information
 Wortendyke Museum - listing at Artcom Museums

Industrial buildings completed in 1770
Buildings and structures in Bergen County, New Jersey
Museums in Bergen County, New Jersey
Agriculture museums in the United States
History museums in New Jersey
Barns on the National Register of Historic Places in New Jersey
Park Ridge, New Jersey
National Register of Historic Places in Bergen County, New Jersey
New Jersey Register of Historic Places
Barns in New Jersey
1770 establishments in New Jersey